Sílvio Luiz Borba da Silva, usually known as Kuki (born April 30, 1971 in Crateús, Ceará), is a Brazilian retired association footballer who played forward and a head coach.

Career

Playing career
Kuki is Náutico's all time's fourth goalscorer. In January 2008, he returned to Náutico from a loan to Santa Cruz, where he went after he was booed by Náutico supporters when the club was defeated by Cruzeiro 4–1 at Estádio dos Aflitos on July 18, 2007, for the Campeonato Brasileiro Série A.

He played Jeonbuk Hyundai Motors in K League in 2002. He only appeared in League Cup 2 matches.

Kuki became the most capped Náutico player on September 13, 2009, during the 2009 Série A, in a game against Grêmio Foot-Ball Porto Alegrense, at Estádio dos Aflitos, after playing his 386th game for the club.

The last club he defended was Clube Náutico Capibaribe. He retired after playing 387 games for the club and scoring 184 goals.

Coaching career
Kuki was hired as Náutico's assistant manager in April 2010, working with head coach Alexandre Gallo during the 2010 season.

Honors
Kuki won the Campeonato Catarinense Second Level in 2000 with Internacional de Lages, and the Campeonato Pernambucano in 2001, 2002, and 2004 with Náutico.

References

External links
 Profile at the Brazil FA Database  
 

1971 births
Living people
Brazilian footballers
Clube Náutico Capibaribe players
Brusque Futebol Clube players
Jeonbuk Hyundai Motors players
Santa Cruz Futebol Clube players
K League 1 players
Brazilian expatriate sportspeople in South Korea
Brazilian expatriate footballers
Expatriate footballers in South Korea
Esporte Clube Internacional de Lages players
Association football forwards
Grêmio Foot-Ball Santanense players
Sportspeople from Ceará